Sérgio Paulo Barbosa Valente (born 27 June 1980), known as Duda, is a Portuguese former footballer who played as a left winger.

He was mostly known for his set pieces and crossing ability, and spent his entire professional career in Spain, collecting more than 300 official appearances for four clubs. He represented mainly Málaga and Sevilla, amassing La Liga totals of 343 matches and 35 goals.

The recipient of 18 caps, Duda appeared for Portugal at the 2010 World Cup.

Club career
Having grown through the ranks of Vitória de Guimarães, Porto-born Duda had not yet played one single competitive senior game when he was sold to Cádiz CF in the third level of Spanish football. For the 2001–02 season he switched to La Liga with Málaga CF and, after a loan move to Segunda División with Levante UD, was everpresent in a team that achieved two consecutive 10th-place finishes, also appearing in the UEFA Cup via the Intertoto.

In 2005–06, involved in a contract dispute, Duda featured scarcely as Málaga was relegated and, during the summer, he joined Andalusia neighbours Sevilla FC. Incidentally, his arrival coincided with the emergence of another left-footed player, Antonio Puerta (whom played as either left back or midfielder); after Puerta's sudden death the following campaign he also played backup, to Diego Capel.

With Capel firmly established as first-choice, Duda was loaned for 2008–09 to an old acquaintance, Málaga, in August 2008. During the season, he was an instrumental attacking element as the side narrowly missed on Europa League qualification, with compatriot Eliseu often playing in the other wing.

In late August 2009, after intense negotiations, Duda moved permanently to Málaga on a four-year contract, with Sevilla benefitting from a percentage of any future sale. In the first season in his second spell he was an instrumental figure as they narrowly avoided relegation, leading the team in goals; May 2010 was a particular active period for the player as he netted in 1–1 draws, at Athletic Bilbao from a direct corner kick and in the season's closer at home against Real Madrid, in which he was also sent off after elbowing Xabi Alonso.

After suffering an injury during the 2010 World Cup, Duda underwent surgery to fix his pubalgia ailment and missed the beginning of the new season. In his return to action, on 21 November 2010, he played the first 60 minutes of a 0–3 away defeat against Deportivo de La Coruña; on 29 January 2011 he celebrated his 200th Spanish top flight match by scoring against Real Zaragoza, but in a 1–2 home defeat.

In the 2011–12 campaign, following the summer signings of Santi Cazorla and Joaquín and the ostracism to which Manuel Pellegrini voted Apoño after the first matchday, Duda was often used as a central midfielder. His first goal of the season came on 22 March 2012 – with his first touch – from a long-range shot in an eventual 4–2 home win over Rayo Vallecano.

On 31 March 2012, Duda made his 200th league appearance for Málaga in a 0–2 home defeat against Real Betis. He started the following season as an habitual substitute but, on 4 December, in a rare start, at home to R.S.C. Anderlecht in the UEFA Champions League group stage, he scored both of his team's goals in a 2–2 draw.

On 1 July 2013, 33-year-old Duda signed a two-year extension to his contract with the option of a third, keeping him with Málaga until 2015. On 1 February of the following year he scored his first goals of the new campaign, netting a brace to help defeat former club Sevilla 3–2 at La Rosaleda Stadium.

In May 2017, Duda announced he was leaving Málaga. He made 349 competitive appearances during his spell, 315 in the Spanish top flight alone. Shortly after, he returned to the club as director of its youth academy.

International career
Duda made his debut with Portugal in 2007 at the age of already 27, as the winger position in the national side was packed with talent (Nani, Ricardo Quaresma, Cristiano Ronaldo, Simão Sabrosa). On 20 August 2008, in a 5–0 friendly win over Faroe Islands, he scored his first goal after coming on as a second-half replacement.

During the 2010 FIFA World Cup qualifiers, Duda was often used as an emergency left back by national coach Carlos Queiroz. He was included in the squad-of-23 for the final stages in South Africa, where he appeared twice in the group stage: playing 20 minutes against North Korea, he assisted to Liédson who took the score to 5–0 in an eventual 7–0 routing; he then started against Brazil, in a 0–0 draw.

Career statistics

Club
Source:

International goals

Honours

Club
Málaga
UEFA Intertoto Cup: 2002

Sevilla
Copa del Rey: 2006–07
Supercopa de España: 2007
UEFA Cup: 2006–07

International
Portugal
UEFA European Under-18 Championship: 1999

References

External links

Stats and bio at Cadistas1910 

1980 births
Living people
Footballers from Porto
Portuguese footballers
Association football wingers
Association football utility players
Vitória S.C. players
La Liga players
Segunda División players
Segunda División B players
Cádiz CF players
Málaga CF players
Levante UD footballers
Sevilla FC players
UEFA Cup winning players
Portugal youth international footballers
Portugal under-21 international footballers
Portugal international footballers
2010 FIFA World Cup players
Portuguese expatriate footballers
Expatriate footballers in Spain
Portuguese expatriate sportspeople in Spain